The Intruders is a 2015 Canadian horror film directed by Adam Massey and written by Jason Juravic and starring Miranda Cosgrove, Donal Logue, Austin Butler, and Tom Sizemore.

Plot 
Nine months after her schizophrenic mother Sophia commits suicide, 20-year-old Rose Halshford (Miranda Cosgrove) moves to Chicago with her father Jerry (Donal Logue), an architect who wants to help his daughter cope with their loss. But Rose, who has suspended her studies at Stanford University for one semester, does not feel comfortable in the hundred-year-old house, and is suspicious almost immediately.

After speaking with Leila Markby, the girl living across the street, she confirms that her new house may be hiding a dark past. Leila's father Howard (Tom Sizemore) soon begins to show strange behaviour. After an uncomfortable night, Rose is surprised by the young craftsman Noah Henry (Austin Butler) coming into her house unexpectedly, whom Jerry has hired to do some renovation work. She befriends Noah, and at the same time tries to find out secrets surrounding the history of the house.

While exploring the home, Rose finds a necklace, the head of a doll, and clues pointing to a woman named "Rachel" who lived in the house previously. Noah tells Rose that a few days before their moving in, he saw the windows in Rose's room locked with boards and a padlock on the door. Jerry is skeptical about his daughter's fears and thinks that she is delusional due to her mother's death.

Nevertheless, Rose continues her search and finds reports about the former inhabitants of the house. She finds that Cheri Garrison and her son Marcus accommodated the drug addict Rachel Winacott, who then disappeared. Howard was the prime suspect in this case, but he was acquitted because Rachel was said to have run away. He also explains this to Rose. Noah invites Rose to a pool party and they kiss. On the same evening Leila disappears.

Rose gets a copy of the construction plans of the house from the archive. When she goes to look at the plans, she faints, and is suspected of having abused pills. After her recovery she gets a message from Noah which lets her know about a hidden room. She finds such a room, and is attacked by Marcus Garrison. He forces her to put on Rachel's dress and tries to rape her, but Rose is able to get away, and in her escape she finds a tied up Leila. Jerry arrives home not long after, and tries to help his daughter, but is knocked down by Marcus. At the same time Rose stabs Marcus with a knife and he collapses.

After the horror has come to an end, Rose again moves to a new house with her father and continues her studies at Northwestern University. The movie ends with Rose looking out of a window and she suddenly sees Marcus staring at her, but then realizes it was just a hallucination.

Cast 
 Miranda Cosgrove as Rose Halshford
 Donal Logue as Jerry Halshford
 Austin Butler as Noah Henry
 Tom Sizemore as Howard Markby
 Jenessa Grant as Leila Markby
 Michael Luckett as Marcus Garrison
 Mackenzie Ball as Charlie
 Claire Calarco as Cheri Garrison
 Jazmin Paradis as Rachel Winacott
 Kelly Boegel as Sophia Halshford
 Jim Calarco as City Hall Records Man

Reception 
The film was panned by critics. The film got 17% (with average rating of 3.5/10) on Rotten Tomatoes. In a review for Toronto Film Scene, William Brownridge wrote that "The Intruders may be good for the PG-13 crowd that has followed Cosgrove through her career and are looking to start watching some spooky films, but for older horror fans, it’s a bit of a bust". Jennifer Eblin comes to a more positive conclusion, stating that "the director and Cosgrove did a good job of leaving us wondering if everything that happened in the film occurred only in her mind or in real life. [...] Though the film does make it clear what happened in the end, it also ends on one of those notes that makes you wonder if maybe Rose really is more like her mother than she thinks."

References

External links 
 

English-language Canadian films
Sony Pictures direct-to-video films
2015 films
2015 horror films
Canadian horror films
Films shot in Greater Sudbury
2010s English-language films
2010s Canadian films